57th Regiment of Foot may refer to:

55th (Westmoreland) Regiment of Foot, 57th Regiment of Foot, raised in 1755 and renumbered as the 55th in 1756
57th (West Middlesex) Regiment of Foot, raised in 1755 as the 59th and renumbered as the 57th in 1756